Safavia may refer to

Safaviya (sufi order), a Sufi order founded by Safi-ad-din Ardabili
Safavid dynasty, a ruling dynasty of Iran, founded by Ismail I